Alqas Mirza, better known by his later name of Safi-(Qoli) Khan Lezgi, was a 17th-century official in Safavid Iran, who hailed from a Lezgian princely family. A native of Dagestan, he was the son of Aldas (Ildas) Mirza Shamkhal, also known as Ildirim Khan Shamkhal, and therefore a member of the family of the Shamkhal of Kumukh. He was sent to the Safavid court in Isfahan at a young age by his father during king Safi's reign (1629-1642), where he grew up and was renamed "Safi(-Qoli) Khan". He served as the governor (hakem) of the Erivan Province (also known as Chokhur-e Sa'd) from 1666 to 1674.

His son, Fath-Ali Khan Daghestani, rose to become one of the most powerful individuals in the Safavid state.

Sources
 
 
  
 

17th-century deaths
Iranian people of Lezgian descent
Safavid governors of Erivan
People from Dagestan
17th-century people of Safavid Iran